John Hodgkinson (7 February 1873 – 19 November 1939) was an Australian cricketer. He played three first-class matches for New South Wales between 1908/09 and 1909/10.

See also
 List of New South Wales representative cricketers

References

External links
 

1873 births
1939 deaths
Australian cricketers
New South Wales cricketers
Cricketers from Sydney